Ezra Asa Cohen-Watnick is an American intelligence official who served as the acting under secretary of defense for intelligence during the Trump Administration. He previously served as the acting assistant secretary of defense for special operations and low-intensity conflict, national security adviser to the United States attorney general and as a former senior director for intelligence programs for the United States National Security Council (NSC).

Early life and education
Cohen-Watnick was raised in Chevy Chase, Maryland. His father was a lawyer, his mother a doctor. Cohen-Watnick earned a Bachelor of Arts in history and political science from the University of Pennsylvania in 2008.

Career 
Cohen-Watnick took a position at the Office of Naval Intelligence after graduation. Before joining the White House, Cohen-Watnick worked for the Defense Intelligence Agency (DIA), beginning in 2010, where he served in Miami, Haiti, Virginia and Afghanistan. Cohen-Watnick was accepted into the training program for the Defense Clandestine Service.

Cohen-Watnick underwent training at Camp Peary (commonly known as "The Farm"), where he was trained by the Central Intelligence Agency. He was assigned to Afghanistan, with a GS-13 rank. He was temporarily assigned to the Defense Intelligence Agency Headquarters in 2014. Cohen-Watnick left the DIA for the National Security Council on January 20, 2017.

National Security Council
Cohen-Watnick was brought into the United States National Security Council by Michael T. Flynn, the former Director of the Defense Intelligence Agency and President Donald Trump's first National Security Advisor. He was named the NSC's Senior Director for Intelligence Programs. This directorship was intermittently held by detailed CIA officers. Like Cohen-Watnick, the immediate preceding Senior Director from the Obama Administration was a political appointee. Some viewed Cohen-Watnick's appointment as a sign of Trump's mistrust of the CIA.

Following Flynn's resignation in February 2017, the new National Security Advisor, H. R. McMaster, attempted to remove Cohen-Watnick, but he was overruled by Trump. McMaster attempted to replace Cohen-Watnick with veteran CIA official Linda Weissgold.

It is alleged that Cohen-Watnick inadvertently identified reports suggesting that members of Trump's campaign team had been subjected to incidental surveillance by the United States intelligence community, as part of an unrelated review of privacy procedures. This information was passed on to Chairman of the House Intelligence Committee Devin Nunes by Assistant White House Counsel Michael Ellis.

It has been reported that Cohen-Watnick has advocated using the American intelligence community to overthrow the current Iranian government.

The White House announced Cohen-Watnick's dismissal on August 2, 2017, following policy disagreements with National Security Advisor H.R. McMaster over Afghanistan, Iran, and Intelligence Oversight. According to The Washington Post, Cohen-Watnick resigned following a power shift under McMaster. Upon Cohen-Watnick's departure, the White House commented that "General McMaster appreciates the good work accomplished in the NSC's Intelligence directorate under Ezra Cohen's leadership... General McMaster is confident that Ezra will make many further significant contributions to national security in another position in the administration."

In late September 2017, Cohen-Watnick was reportedly succeeded by Michael Barry.

Support for counterintelligence initiatives 
In May 2017, Cohen-Watnick and the FBI assistant director for counterintelligence reportedly advocated for strong law enforcement actions against Chinese government officials conducting operations targeting Chinese dissidents and asylum seekers inside the United States, against objections from Acting Assistant Secretary of State Susan Thornton. Cohen-Watnick reportedly charged Thornton with "improperly hindering law-enforcement efforts to address China's repeated violations of U.S. sovereignty and law."

On December 25, 2017, The Washington Post reported that in the weeks before Trump's inauguration, Brett Holmgren, Cohen-Watnick's predecessor in the Obama White House, briefed Cohen-Watnick on the actions the Obama Administration had taken to counter Russian active measures. Once in the job, Cohen-Watnick sent out memos identifying counterintelligence threats, including Russia's, as his top priority, officials said. He convened regular meetings in the White House Situation Room at which he pressed counterintelligence officials in other government agencies, including the CIA, to finalize plans for Russia, including those left behind by the Obama team, according to officials in attendance. By spring, national security adviser H. R. McMaster, senior White House Russia adviser Fiona Hill and Cohen-Watnick began advocating measures to counter Russian disinformation using covert influence and cyber-operations, according to officials.

Justice Department 
In April 2018, he rejoined the Trump administration in the United States Department of Justice, advising then-Attorney General Jeff Sessions on counterterrorism and counterintelligence.

Defense Department
In May 2020, Cohen-Watnick was appointed as deputy assistant secretary of defense for counternarcotics and global threats. By September 2020, he had been promoted to acting assistant secretary of defense for special operations and low-intensity conflict. On November 10, 2020, President Trump relieved a number of senior defense officials including Secretary of Defense Mark Esper, and Undersecretary of Defense for Intelligence Joseph Kernen resigned in anticipation. Trump appointed Cohen-Watnick to fill the role as acting undersecretary with principal deputy Joseph Tonon assuming the day-to-day duties of the role of ASD SO/LIC.

In December 2020, Cohen-Watnick was appointed by Trump to chair the Public Interest Declassification Board. He continued serving into Joe Biden's presidency.

Personal life
Cohen-Watnick is a member of the Union League of Philadelphia, a Republican-leaning patriotic society. He married Rebecca Miller, who served as deputy assistant secretary for public affairs at the Treasury Department, in November 2016, in a Jewish ceremony.

Some adherents of the QAnon conspiracy theory believed Cohen to be the eponymous "Q", a belief Cohen said he found disturbing. In a January 2021 interview, he criticized the Trump administration for not doing more to delegitimize QAnon.

References

1986 births
Living people
Pennsylvania Republicans
People of the Defense Intelligence Agency
Trump administration personnel
United States Department of Defense officials
United States Department of Justice officials
United States National Security Council staffers
University of Pennsylvania alumni
Jewish American government officials